Stephen Finnie (born 13 October 1969) is a Scottish former football referee.

References

External links
Soccerbase

1969 births
Living people
Scottish football referees
Place of birth missing (living people)
Scottish Football League referees
Scottish Premier League referees
Scottish Professional Football League referees